The Buriram Stadium (known for sponsorship purposes as  Chang Arena) is a 32,600-seat football stadium in Buriram, Thailand. The stadium is the home of Thailand's 2011, 2013, and 2015 treble champions, Buriram United. Chang Arena is the largest club-owned football stadium in Thailand. Its nickname is "The Thunder Castle", the fifth castle of Buriram Province.

History
Chang Arena is in the Isan sub-districts, Mueang Buriram District, Buriram Province. The 150-acre site has a capacity of 32,600 people with parking for 500 cars and 1,000 motorcycles. The pitch is floodlit, allowing for night matches. It is funded under the title-assignment contract from I-Mobile and parts of club president Newin Chidchob. The stadium was recorded in Guinness World Records that is the only FIFA-level football stadium in the world with the lowest construction time in the world with 256 days.

Name
The stadium was originally named "New I-Mobile Stadium" due to a sponsorship agreement with I-Mobile. It is also known as "Thunder Castle Stadium". 

In 2017 the stadium was renamed to "Chang Arena" due to the sponsorship of Chang beer. The stadium is referred to by its official name, Buriram Stadium, by the Asian Football Confederation (AFC).

Facilities

The stadium is the first sole-use football stadium in Thailand that meets FIFA and AFC standards. The stadium is eligible to host all levels of domestic or international football matches. The stadium houses locker rooms for home and visiting teams, modern medical facilities, and television and radio broadcasting facilities.

International football matches

2020 AFC U-23 Championship

Attendances

The average and highest attendances at Buriram United domestic league competitions:

References

Football venues in Thailand
Buildings and structures in Buriram province
Sports venues completed in 2011
2011 establishments in Thailand